Armin Thurnher (born 21 February 1949) is an Austrian journalist. He is publisher and editor-in-chief of the Viennese city newspaper Falter.

Life 
Thurnher was born in Bregenz. He is also co-owner of the Falter publishing house. In the 1980s, he was the correspondent in Vienna for the cultural magazine . In the 1990s, he worked for the weekly newspapers Die Zeit and Die Woche. His columns appeared among others in the daily newspapers AZ, Die Presse and Kleine Zeitung. He also sits on the board of open television Okto, where he is also one of the presenters of the Das Medienquartett programme.

Thurnher is a critic of the Austrian print media landscape, which is dominated by the Kronen Zeitung and the glossy magazines of the NEWS group. He concluded his editorials in the Falter, every week for twenty years, in the style of Cato's Ceterum censeo Carthaginem esse delendam with the sentence: For the rest, I am of the opinion that the Mediamil complex must be smashed.

In August 2014, Thurnher discontinued the habit of the last sentence, which had been cultivated over decades and had become dear to his readers. The word formation Feschismus, a portmanteau from Fascism and fesch, also goes back to Thurnher.<ref>Österreich Wo man sich's richtet In Die Zeit. Online: For twelve years Charles E. Ritterband reported on Austrian politics for the Neue Zürcher Zeitung. Now he is resigning from this function. The résumé of a reporter who went out to learn to understand an operetta state." By Charles E. Ritterband 14 February 2013.</ref>

 Works 
 Schwarze Zwerge. Österreichs Medienlandschaft und ihre Bewohner. Sonderzahl, Vienna 1992, .
 Franz Vranitzky im Gespräch mit Armin Thurnher. Eichborn Verlag, Frankfurt 1992, .
 Österreich neu. Der Report an den Kanzler. Zwölf Provokationen zu Themen der Zeit. Kremayr & Scheriau, Vienna 1994, .
 Aufgezeichnet: Leon Zelman: Ein Leben nach dem Überleben. Kremayr und Scheriau, Vienna 1995, .
 Das Trauma, ein Leben. Österreichische Einzelheiten. Zsolnay, Vienna 1999, .
 Heimniederlage. Nachrichten aus dem neuen Österreich. Zsolnay, Vienna 2000, .
 Wie werde ich Magazin-Journalist? In Reinhard Christl, Silke Rudorfer (ed.): Wie werde ich Journalist/in? Wege in den Traumberuf. LIT Verlag, Vienna 2007, pp. 161 ff.
 Die Wege entstehen im Gehen. Alfred Gusenbauer im Gespräch mit Katharina Krawagna-Pfeifer und Armin Thurnher. Czernin, Vienna 2008, .
 Der Übergänger. Roman, Zsolnay, Vienna 2009, .
 Thurnher auf Rezept. Die besten Kochideen aus Visa Magazin, Magazin Complete und Falter. Falter, Vienna 2010, .
 Republik ohne Würde. Zsolnay, Vienna 2013, .
 Ach, Österreich! Europäische Lektionen aus der Alpenrepublik. Zsolnay, Vienna 2016, .
 Fähre nach Manhattan: Mein Jahr in Amerika. Zsolnay, Vienna 2019, .

 Awards 
 1991: Preis der Stadt Wien für Publizistik
 1999: Ehrenpreis des Vorarlberger Buchhandels
 1999: Bruno-Kreisky-Preis für das politische Buch (Hauptpreis) für Das Trauma, ein Leben. Österreichische Einzelheiten 2000: Silbernes Ehrenzeichen der Stadt Wien
 2001: Kurt-Vorhofer-Preis für Publizistik
 2002: Dr.-Karl-Renner-Publizistikpreis
 2005: , Kategorie Pressefreiheit [Wiener Stadtzeitung Falter]
 2010: Ehrenpreis des österreichischen Buchhandels für Toleranz in Denken und Handeln
 2013: Otto-Brenner-Preis, Kategorie "Spezial"
 2016: Bruno-Kreisky-Preis für das politische Buch, Preis für das publizistische Gesamtwerk.

 References 

 Further reading 
 : Skeptischer Patriot. In Börsenblatt'' 173 (2006) 37, .

External links 

 
 
 
 
 Ausgewählte FALTER-Artikel von Armin Thurnher
 Radio-Portrit of Armin Thurnher in the Ö1 broadcast series "Chronisten, Reporter, Aufklärer" aus dem Jahr 2002

Austrian editors
Austrian columnists
20th-century Austrian journalists
21st-century Austrian journalists
Opinion journalists
1949 births
Living people
People from Bregenz